Antonio Banfi (Vimercate, 30 September 1886 – Milano, 22 July 1957) was an Italian philosopher and senator. He is also noted for founding the Italian philosophical school called critical rationalism.

Although influenced by the Marburg neo-Kantians and Edmund Husserl, whom he knew personally, Banfi moved away from Idealism and instead focused on Marxism, in particular, historical materialism.

Banfi joined the Italian Communist Party in 1947. He was elected to the Italian senate in 1948 and again in 1953.

Antonio Banfi was a chair of the University of Milan's History of Philosophy department. Among his students were Dino Formaggio and Mario Dal Pra.

References

 Garin, E., "Banfi, Antonio" in Brochert, D. M. (ed.), Encyclopedia of Philosophy, Second Edition, vol. 1 (Thomson Gale, 2006), p. 476.
 Garin, E., History of Italian Philosophy, vol. 2 (Rodopi, 2008), p. 1292.
 Guiat, C., The French and Italian Communist Parties: Comrades and Culture (Frank Cass Publishers, 2003), pp. 144–150.

1886 births
1957 deaths
People from Vimercate
Italian Communist Party politicians
Senators of Legislature I of Italy
Senators of Legislature II of Italy
Members of the Italian Senate from Lombardy
20th-century Italian philosophers
Materialists
Manifesto of the Anti-Fascist Intellectuals